Tara Allison Borromeo Shelton (born June 26, 2001) is a footballer who plays as a defender for DLSU Lady Booters. Born in the United States, she represents the Philippines women's national team.

Early life and education
Shelton was born in the United States in Edmonds, Washington. She has roots in the Philippines, particularly in Cavite and Manila. She has attended the Holy Names Academy and later the De La Salle University.

Career
Shelton was part of the Holy Names Academy's football (soccer) team. After graduating from Holy Names in 2019, she had committed to play for Pacific Lutheran University in the US NCAA.

She moved to the Philippines, where she played for the De La Salle University's women's football team which played in the PFF Women's League.

International career
Shelton has represented the Philippines internationally. She has been part of the national team rosters which competed at the 2019 Southeast Asian Games and the 2022 AFC Women's Asian Cup qualifiers. She was also included in the final roster for the competition proper. Shelton scored her first international senior goal in a 3–0 friendly win against Bosnia and Herzegovina in Brežice, Slovenia, through a left-footed strike from outside the box.

International goals
Scores and results list the Philippines' goal tally first.

Honours

International

Philippines 

 AFF Women's Championship: 2022

References

2001 births
Living people
Citizens of the Philippines through descent
Filipino women's footballers
Women's association football defenders
Philippines women's international footballers
People from Edmonds, Washington
Sportspeople from the Seattle metropolitan area
Soccer players from Washington (state)
American women's soccer players
American sportspeople of Filipino descent